This is a comprehensive discography of Millencolin, a Swedish punk rock band. The band rose to popularity in 2000 with their album Pennybridge Pioneers. They have released nine studio albums, two compilation albums, six EPs, and numerous singles.

Notes
 The first album was called "Tiny Tunes", but they had to change the cover and title due to legal trouble with Warner Bros in 1996. They decided to call it Same old tunes, since it contains the same old songs. The Walt Disney Company also initiated legal action against the band over the title of the song "Disney Time", which was subsequently re-titled "Diznee Time".
 Pennybridge Pioneers was the first gold album. Over 35000 copies sold in Australia.
 The "Yellow Bird" appears in all albums and compilations, except for Home from Home.
Life on a Plate reached gold-status in Sweden April 2002 seven years after the release. Over 50 000 copies sold in Sweden.
Many people think that Sense & Sensibility of the True Brew is a single but according to Erik in an interview to Music Feed from Australia: "it's not actually a single but it reached a good rotation here and the radio in Sweden as well it's actually a launch track of the album. It's a launch track of the album and epitaph our record label told us like can you guys do like a stationary YouTube clip for this or maybe like a lyric clip but since I'm doing a lot of video editing and stuff like let's do a complete no budget video for this using GoPro".
Nowadays there are 6 songs that have not been released in any Millencolin's compilation or single. Check below:

Albums

Studio albums

Compilation albums

Video albums

Soundtrack albums

Split albums

Extended plays

Demotapes

Singles

Music videos

References

Punk rock group discographies
Discographies of Swedish artists